Pau-Latina is the seventh studio album by Mexican singer Paulina Rubio, released on February 10, 2004, by Universal Music Latino.  Musically, Rubio wanted to make a "futuristic folk", thus incorporating eclectic latin music in its sound with instrumentation from techno beats, guitars, drums, synthesizers, strings and spanish guitars musical instruments. Its themes range from love, dancing, friendship and feminist. Contributions to the album's production came from a wide range of producers, including Emilio Estefan, Chris Rodríguez, Toy Hernández, Marzello Acevedo and Sergio George.

Upon its release, the album received generally favorable reviews from music critics, who complimented its production and they considered it as the "follow-up" of her album Paulina (2000). The album debuted atop the Latin Albums Billboard charts in the United States and was certified double Latin Platinum by the Recording Industry Association of America (RIAA). The album became another success for Rubio and sold at least 500,000 worldwide.

Four singles were released. It became Rubio's most successful era in the US Latin charts, being her first album to score four top-ten singles on the US Billboard Hot Latin Songs, with "Te Quise Tanto", "Algo Tienes", "Dame Otro Tequila" and "Mía", two of these peaking at numbers one. Rubio promoted the album with television performances and the Pau-Latina Tour.

Background and production 
Rubio first expressed her intent to re-record an "entire album in Spanish" at the Spanish press release of her first and only English album to date, Border Girl, in June, 2002. She also revealed that he wanted to collaborate with Manu Chao and Armando Manzanero, who composed the ballad "Tal Vez, Quizá", for his fifth studio album, Paulina (2000). Jorge Villamizar, lead member of Bacilos, told Billboard in September 2003, he co-wrote a track with her wife, Sandra Uribe, for Rubio's upcoming album. He revealed the name of the song: "Perros", and said that the singer record it in English and Spanish. In January 2004, a month before the album's release, Argentine composer Ferra announced that he and Reyli Barba wrote Rubio a song called "Amor Secreto", "a bolero, and the story is tender, very romantic. The song was chosen by Paulina and adaptations were made to it that she suggested."

Production and promotion
Pau-Latina marks Paulina's return to the Spanish-language market after her English debut album. For the production of the album, Paulina collaborated with songwriters and producers Chris Rodríguez, M. Benito, Andrés Levin, Ileana Padrón, Coti, Andahí, Adrian Schinoff, T. Méndez, E. Pérez, José de Jesús, Marco Antonio Solís, Jorge Villamizar, Xandra Uribe, Emilio Estefan, Ricardo Gaitán,  Alberto Gaitán, Nicolás Tovar, Tony Mardini, Tom McWilliams, Juan Carlos Pérez-Soto, Reyli, Angie Chirino, Tim Mitchell, Clay Ostwald, C. Brant, Richard Vission, G. Brown, and A. Cee. Also, this is the second time since Planeta Paulina that Paulina participates as a songwriter in three of the album's tracks: "My Friend, Mi Amigo", "Baila Que Baila" y "Dame Tu Amor".

To promote the album Rubio started her first solo concert tour named Pau-Latina Tour.

Singles
Pau-Latina spawned four official singles, giving Paulina her first two number one hits on Latin radio in the U.S.: "Te Quise Tanto" and "Dame Otro Tequila". With this album, Paulina became one of the few artists to have four Top 10 singles from the same album on the Billboard Hot Latin Tracks chart.

"Te Quise Tanto" is Rubio's most successful single to date, which spent six non-consecutive weeks at #1 and earned several music awards. The album's third single, "Dame Otro Tequila", also climbed to #1 in December 2004. Although "Algo Tienes" and "Mía" were the only other two singles released by Rubio's record label, that did not prevent tracks like "My Friend, Mi Amigo", "Perros", "Alma En Libertad", and "Volverás" from gaining airplay with no promotion on behalf of Paulina's record label. Music videos released for the album were "Te Quise Tanto", "Algo Tienes", "Dame Otro Tequila", "Mia". Other songs that get airplay were: "My Friend, Mi Amigo", "Perros", "Alma en Libertad", "Volverás".

Critical reception

The album received generally positive reviews from music critics. AllMusic editor Johnny Loftus viewed that "Throughout Pau-Latina, there's an alluring scratchiness to Rubio's voice.", then compared the beats to Border Girl'''s and said "is sure to please fans of 2000's Paulina. Leila Cobo of Billboard also praised Rubio's voice, assuring it is "thin and raspy but thoroughly convincing.", she said that Pau-Latina "blends a variety of Latin rhythms and pop beats for an overall effect that's fun but not facile." calling the album like the "follow-up" of Paulina as "feel-good pop." Rapsody reviewer Sarah Bardeen considered the album "brilliant" because "Rubio incorporates elements of rap, reggaeton, flamenco and ranchera while maintaining her own consistently feathery pop sensibility." Likewise, Matt Cibula from PopMatters called it as a "fractured fairytale pop from some dimension where everyone gets laid all the time and no one is ever sad." Included it  in her "best however-many-it-ends-up-being albums of 2004" list.

The album was nominated for a Latin Grammy Award in 2004 for Best Female Pop Vocal Album and a Grammy Award for Best Latin Pop Album in 2005.

 Commercial performance 
With this album, Rubio became one of the few female Latin singers to achieve four top ten singles from a single album on the Billboard Hot Latin Tracks chart: "Te Quise Tanto" (#1), "Algo Tienes" (#4), "Dame Otro Tequila" (#1) and "Mía" (#8). Also, Pau-Latina was number one in sales in Mexico as well as the U.S. on the Billboard Top Latin Albums chart. In Rubio's native Mexico, Pau-Latina entered and peaked at number one on the albums chart. One month after its release, it received certified gold on March 10, 2004, for shipments of 50,000 copies. The Asociación Mexicana de Productores de Fonogramas y Videogramas(AMPROFON) certified the album platinum and sold 100,000 units in the country. In the United States, the album debuted at number one on the Billboard Billboard Top Latin Albums chart. It remained inside the top 10 for many weeks. Pau-Latina was certified double-platinum by the Recording Industry Association of America (RIAA) on March 16, 2004. In April 2004, Rubio received her first certifications from the United States and Mexico, platinum and gold record, respectively, in Miami for selling 400,000 copies three months after the launch of Pau-Latina''. In Ecuador, the album sold 19,000 copies through Bellsouth

Track listing

Personnel

Gaitán Bros Ricardo Gaitán & Alberto Gaitán — producer, arranger, programming, background vocals, engineers & composers
Archie Peña — producer
Sebastian Krys — mixing
Sergio George — keyboards, drum programming, producer
Marteen — producer
Tom Coyne — mastering
Javier Garza — engineer
Marcello Azevedo — guitar, bajo sexto, arranger, producer, keyboards
Jorge González — engineer
Alfred Figueroa — engineer, mixing
Bob "Bassy" Bob Brackmann — mixing
Toy Hernández — producer, engineer
Tony Mardini — engineer, mixing
Felipe Tichauer — engineer
Tea Time — rap
Mike Weitman — mixing assistant
Max Kolibe — engineer
Sacha Triujeque — producer, engineer

Chris Rodríguez — arranger, producer, programming
Frank Maddocks — graphic design, art direction
Javier Carrión — engineer
Steven Sunset — engineer
Richard McLaren — photography
Tata Bigorra — coros
Jake R. Tañer — engineer
Danita Ruiz — management
Caresse Henry — management
MC Wave — rap
César Nieto — DJ
Paulina Rubio — executive producer
Carlos Alvarez — engineer
Hal Batt — engineer
Scott Canto — engineer
Emilio Estefan — didgeridoo, producer

Charts

Weekly charts

Year-end charts

Certifications and sales

References

External links
Paulina Rubio: Pau-Latina - Listen, Review and Buy at ARTISTdirect

2004 albums
Paulina Rubio albums
Spanish-language albums
Albums produced by Emilio Estefan
Universal Music Mexico albums